Nicholas John Seymour Mackintosh,  (9 July 1935 – 8 February 2015) was a British experimental psychologist and author, specialising in intelligence, psychometrics and animal learning.

Education
Mackintosh was born in London, the son of Ian Mackintosh and his wife Daphne Cochrane. He was educated at Winchester College and the University of Oxford where he was a student of Magdalen College, Oxford and obtained a Bachelor of Arts degree followed by a Doctor of Philosophy degree in 1963 supervised by Stuart Sutherland.

Career and research
From 1964 until 1967 he was a lecturer at the University of Oxford. From 1967 until 1973 he held a Killiam Professorship at Dalhousie University in Halifax, Canada. From 1973 to 1981 he taught at the University of Sussex, prior to being appointed Head of the Department of Experimental Psychology in the University of Cambridge in 1981 until his retirement in 2002.

Mackintosh held visiting professorships at the University of Pennsylvania, University of California, Berkeley, University of Hawaii, University of New South Wales and Yale University. He was a Fellow of King's College, Cambridge.

Awards and honours
The British Psychological Society awarded him the Biological Medal in 1984 and the President's Award in 1986. In 1987 he was elected a Fellow of the Royal Society. He was, until his death, Emeritus Professor of Experimental Psychology as well as Distinguished Associate in the Psychometrics Centre in the University of Cambridge. He died in Bury St Edmunds at the age of 79 on 8 February 2015 after a short illness.

Selected books

References

Fellows of the Royal Society
Fellows of King's College, Cambridge
Animal cognition writers
British psychologists
Intelligence researchers
1935 births
2015 deaths